The 1990 French Figure Skating Championships took place in Annecy for singles and in Bordeaux for ice dance. Skaters competed in the disciplines of men's singles, women's singles, and ice dancing on the senior level. The event was used to help determine the French team to the 1990 World Championships and the 1990 European Championships.

Results

Men

Ladies

Ice dance

External links
 French article

French Figure Skating Championships, 1990
1990 in French sport
French Figure Skating Championships